A by-election was held for the New South Wales Legislative Assembly electorate of Central Cumberland on 6 June 1863 because of the resignation of James Atkinson due to insolvency, who then re-contested the seat.

Dates

Result

James Atkinson resigned due to insolvency and re-contested the seat.

See also
Electoral results for the district of Central Cumberland
List of New South Wales state by-elections

References

1863 elections in Australia
New South Wales state by-elections
1860s in New South Wales